Nadiradze is a Georgian surname. It may refer to
Alexander Nadiradze (1914–1987), Soviet inventor, designer and engineer
Giorgi Nadiradze (footballer) (born 1968), Georgian international footballer
Giorgi Nadiradze (cyclist) (born 1987), Georgian road bicycle racer
Giorgi Nadiradze (photographer) (born 1993), Georgian photographer
Kolau Nadiradze (1895–1990), Georgian poet
Marina Nadiradze (born 1978), Georgian pianist

Georgian-language surnames
Surnames of Georgian origin